La Salvetat-sur-Agout (literally La Salvetat on Agout) is a commune in the Hérault department in the Occitanie region in southern France.

Population

See also
Communes of the Hérault department

References

External links
Office de Tourisme La Salvetat-Sur-Agoût in French; offers automatic translation to English

Communes of Hérault